Statistics of Copenhagen Football Championship in the 1903/1904 season.

Overview
It was contested by 5 teams, and Boldklubben Frem won the championship.

League standings

References
Denmark - List of final tables (RSSSF)

1903–04 in Danish football
Top level Danish football league seasons
Copenhagen Football Championship seasons
Denmark